Norbert Kiss (born 29 June 1980 in Kaposvár) is a Hungarian 9 pin bowling player who plays for Szegedi TE  and Hungary national team.

References

1980 births
Living people
People from Kaposvár
Hungarian nine-pin bowling players
Sportspeople from Somogy County